Anatoly Alexandrovich Nikulin (August 21, 1923 in Saratov, Soviet Union – October 14, 1996 in Ryazan, Russia) was a Russian pharmacologist, Doctor of Medical Sciences. From 1961 to 1983, he was Rector of the Ryazan State Medical University (RSMU). In 1967, he received the title of Professor.

Member of the Communist Party of the Soviet Union since 1945. 
He graduated with honors from the Saratov State Medical University in 1946.
In 1949, he defended his Candidate's Dissertation.
He started working at the RSMU in 1953.
From 1959 to 1990, Nikulin headed the Department of Pharmacology.
In 1966, he defended his doctoral dissertation.
He worked in the field of apitherapy.

He was a member of the Editorial Board for «Фармакология и токсикология».

He was awarded:
 Order of the October Revolution (1971)
 Order of the Badge of Honour (1966)
 Medal "Veteran of Labour" (1986)

External links
 ДИНАСТИЯ. Вып. 1: Никулины: (К 90-летию со дня рождения А. А. Никулина): сборник документов, воспоминаний и фотографий

Russian pharmacologists
Apitherapists
Communist Party of the Soviet Union members
Soviet professors
1923 births
1996 deaths